Damian Leothon Stevens (born 2 June 1995) is a Namibian rugby union player for South African side  in the Rugby Challenge. He currently plays for NOLA Gold of Major League Rugby (MLR) in the United States. He is also the head coach of the Harahan River Coyotes Rugby Football Club. 

He was named in Namibia's squad for the 2015 Rugby World Cup.

International career
Damian played in both the 2015 and 2019 Rugby World Cups. In the 2019 Rugby World Cup, he scored 14 points: Namibia's opening try against Italy, and 9 points (from penalties) against New Zealand.

References

1995 births
Living people
Boland Cavaliers players
Griquas (rugby union) players
Namibia international rugby union players
Namibian rugby union players
New Orleans Gold players
Yacare XV players
Rugby union players from Walvis Bay
Rugby union scrum-halves
Sharks (Currie Cup) players
Western Province (rugby union) players